Henderson County is a county located in the U.S. state of Illinois. According to the 2010 United States Census, it has a population of 7,331. Its county seat is Oquawka.

Henderson County is part of the Burlington, IA–IL Micropolitan Statistical Area.

History
Henderson County was formed in 1841 from a portion of Warren County. It was named for Henderson County, Kentucky, which was named for Richard Henderson, founder of the Transylvania Company, an early attempt to organize what later became Kentucky around 1775.

Geography

Climate and weather

Major highways

  U.S. Highway 34
  Illinois Route 94
  Illinois Route 96
  Illinois Route 116
  Illinois Route 164

Adjacent counties

 Mercer County - north
 Warren County - east
 McDonough County - southeast
 Hancock County - south
 Lee County, Iowa - southwest
 Des Moines County, Iowa - west

Demographics

As of the 2010 United States Census, there were 7,331 people, 3,149 households, and 2,127 families residing in the county. The racial makeup of the county was 98.2% white, 0.2% Asian, 0.2% American Indian, 0.2% black or African American, 0.1% Pacific islander, 0.2% from other races, and 1.0% from two or more races. Those of Hispanic or Latino origin made up 1.1% of the population. In terms of ancestry, 24.4% were German, 14.5% were Irish, 11.9% were English, 5.9% were Swedish, and 5.0% were American.

Of the 3,149 households, 26.9% had children under the age of 18 living with them, 54.9% were married couples living together, 8.7% had a female householder with no husband present, 32.5% were non-families, and 27.3% of all households were made up of individuals. The average household size was 2.31 and the average family size was 2.78. The median age was 47.2 years.

The median income for a household in the county was $43,450 and the median income for a family was $55,154. Males had a median income of $41,052 versus $27,426 for females. The per capita income for the county was $22,492. About 7.8% of families and 11.4% of the population were below the poverty line, including 13.3% of those under age 18 and 8.3% of those age 65 or over.

Politics
As part of Yankee-settled Northern Illinois, Henderson County was solidly Whig in its first three elections and then equally Republican from that party's formation until the Great Depression. Franklin D. Roosevelt in 1932 was the first Democrat to win it, but the county returned to Republican Alf Landon in 1936 and was not won by a Democrat until the GOP nominated the southern-oriented conservative Barry Goldwater in 1964.

After that, like many Yankee counties, it returned to its Republican roots between 1968 and 1984, but with the shift of the GOP to a Southern Evangelical perspective Henderson County turned reliably Democratic in presidential elections from 1988 to 2012. Republican Donald Trump carried the county with over 61 percent of the vote in 2016; the highest percentage won by any Republican candidate since Dwight D. Eisenhower in 1956, and the lowest by a Democrat since Al Smith in 1928.

Henderson County is located in Illinois's 17th Congressional District and is currently represented by Democrat Cheri Bustos. For the Illinois House of Representatives, the county is located in the 94th district and is currently represented by Republican Randy Frese. The county is located in the 47th district of the Illinois Senate, and is currently represented by Republican Jil Tracy.

Communities

City
 Dallas City (partly in Hancock County)

Villages

 Biggsville
 Gladstone
 Gulf Port
 Lomax
 Media
 Oquawka
 Raritan
 Stronghurst

Unincorporated communities

 Bald Bluff
 Carman
 Carthage Lake
 Decorra
 Hopper
 Olena
 Shokonon
 Terre Haute

Townships
Henderson County is divided into eleven townships:

 Bald Bluff
 Biggsville
 Carman
 Gladstone
 Lomax
 Media
 Oquawka
 Raritan
 Rozetta
 Stronghurst
 Terre Haute

State and Federal facilities
 Big River State Forest - 2,900 acre preserve adjacent to the Mississippi River (1925)
 Delabar State Park - 89 acre preserve adjacent to the Mississippi River (1960)
 Oquawka State Wildlife Refuge

See also
 National Register of Historic Places listings in Henderson County, Illinois

Footnotes

Further reading
 History of Mercer and Henderson Counties, Together with Biographical Matter, Statistics, Etc. Chicago: H.H. Hill and Company, 1882.

External links
  Henderson County Public Library District
 Henderson County Economic Development Corporation
 Henderson County Genealogy
 Henderson County Tombstone Project

 
Illinois counties
1841 establishments in Illinois
Populated places established in 1841
Burlington, Iowa micropolitan area
Illinois counties on the Mississippi River